Reversed Ze with diaeresis (Ԑ̈ ԑ̈; italics: Ԑ̈ ԑ̈) is a letter of the Cyrillic script.

Reversed Ze with diaeresis is used in the Khanty language.

See also
Cyrillic characters in Unicode

Cyrillic letters with diacritics
Letters with diaeresis